Cartwright may refer to:
 Wainwright (occupation), a tradesperson skilled in the making and repairing of carts or wagons
 Cartwright (surname), including the list of people

Places
 Australia
 Cartwright, New South Wales

 Canada
 Cartwright, Manitoba
 Cartwright, Newfoundland and Labrador
 Cartwright Airport
 Cartwright High School in Blackstock, Ontario
 Cartwright Point, Ontario
 Cartwright Sound, British Columbia

 United States
 Cartwright, North Dakota
 Cartwright, Oklahoma
 Cartwright, Texas

Other uses 
 Cartwright Carmichael, basketball player
 Cartwright Inquiry, an investigation into medical malpractice in New Zealand
 Yt antigen system, also known as Cartwright

See also 
 Wainwright (disambiguation)
 Wheelwright (disambiguation)
 Wright (disambiguation)